"Darn That Dream" is a popular song composed by Jimmy Van Heusen with lyrics by Eddie DeLange. It was published in 1939 and ranked No. 1 in 1940 when a recording was released by Benny Goodman in an arrangement by Eddie Sauter with Mildred Bailey singing the vocal. Other popular recordings in 1940 were by Blue Barron & His Orchestra (vocal by Russ Carlyle) (#14 in Billboard charts) and by Tommy Dorsey (vocal by Anita Boyer) (#16 in Billboard charts).

The song was introduced in the Broadway musical Swingin' the Dream, a variation on A Midsummer Night's Dream by William Shakespeare set in New Orleans in 1890. The musical opened at Center Theatre in November 1939 and closed after 13 performances.

Other versions
 Tony Bennett – for his album Cloud 7 (1955).
 Jane Ira Bloom – Sixteen Sunsets (2013)
 Petula Clark – Petula Clark in Hollywood (1959).
 Miles Davis – Birth of the Cool (1950)
 Doris Day – a single release for Columbia Records (catalog No. 38887) in 1950.
 Michael Feinstein – Romance on Film, Romance on Broadway (2000).
 Ella Fitzgerald – Ella Swings Gently with Nelson (1961).
 Dexter Gordon – Daddy Plays the Horn (1955)
 Lars Gullin – Lars Gullin Quartet (1960).
 Billie Holiday – Body and Soul (1957).
 Lena Horne – Lena on the Blue Side (1962).
 Ahmad Jamal – Ahmad Jamal Plays (1955) rereleased as Chamber Music of the New Jazz (1956)
 Stan Kenton – Sophisticated Approach (1961)
 Tina May – Fun (1993)
 Thelonious Monk – The Unique Thelonious Monk (1956).
 Patti Page – You Go to My Head (1956).
 Maxine Sullivan – Close as Pages in a Book (1970).
 Sarah Vaughan – No Count Sarah (1959).
 Dinah Washington – Dinah Jams (1954).
 Nancy Wilson – But Beautiful (1971).

See also
List of 1930s jazz standards

References

External links 
Jimmy Van Heusen Website
JazzStandard.com - Song Information

Songs about dreams
Songs with music by Jimmy Van Heusen
Songs with lyrics by Eddie DeLange
1939 songs
1930s jazz standards
Songs from musicals
Benny Goodman songs
Jazz compositions in G major